Sruthilayalu  is a 1987 Telugu-language musical drama film, directed by K. Viswanath. The film stars Rajasekhar and Sumalatha with soundtrack composed by K. V. Mahadevan. It was released on 30 April 1987. The film garnered eight Nandi Awards and also won Filmfare Award for Best Director – Telugu. The film was premiered at the International Film Festival of India, and AISFM Film Festival. The film was dubbed in Tamil as Isaikku Oru Koil.

Plot
The film revolves around the role of Naidu, a Carnatic musician and elder son Narayana Murthy who starts getting recognized in the world because of the music learned from Naidu and leaves everyone to fall into the worldly pleasures, forgetting his base roots. It is now the duty of Sita, the daughter-in-law of Naidu to bring these souls on track.

The film starts with Mr. Naidu, a great fan of music and traditional Indian fine arts. He wants his only son to become a great musician, but unfortunately he loses his son in a car accident.
 
Then he adopts three orphaned street children and teaches them Carnatic music so they can make his dream of building and starting an academy of fine arts come true. Sita is also a fan of music and loves Mr. Narayana. Naidu agrees for them to get married and Shankar, the second son marries a rich girl.

Naidu sends the three sons to city to earn sufficient money to start the construction of a Music academy named Sangeetha Bharathi. But all three forget the cause they come for once they get popularity in city and they get addicted to bad habits. They disrespect his father once and Narayana Murthy even tries to hit his pregnant wife. All this makes Mr. Naidu send the three sons away from home. Then Sita, the daughter-in-law takes the onus to make Mr. Naidu's dream come true. She makes her son Srinivas a great musician and dancer. After a long time, she returns to the city where her husband lives. There she gets Narayana Murthy to take interest in their son's talents without revealing herself to Narayana Murthy or his brother.

Narayana, who doesn't know his son, appreciates his talents well and accepts to teach him music. Sita makes the other two sons of Mr. Naidu also to concentrate on music through her son. She teaches them a lesson and they come to the realize what they did wrong.

In the end, all the sons come together and meet their father and ask for his forgiveness. He forgives them and they start afresh to try and establish the Music Academy which is later named as Sangeetha Bharathi

Cast 

Rajasekhar as Narayana Murthy
Sumalatha as Sita
Kaikala Satyanarayana as Naidu 
Shanmukha Srinivas as Srinivas
Murali Krishna as Murali
Naresh as Shankar
Anjali Devi
Mucherla Aruna as Girija
Jayalalita as Panchali
Mallikarjuna Rao
Jit Mohan Mitra as Anjaneyulu
Potti Prasad
Sakshi Ranga Rao as Ramadasu
Vankayala Satyanarayana
Sanjay Vadapalli

Soundtrack 

Soundtrack composed by K. V. Mahadevan was released through LEO music label. Lyrics were written by Sirivennela Seetharama Sastry while this film used songs of Annamacharya, Tyagaraja, Narayana Teertha and Shailendra.

Awards

References

External links

1980s musical drama films
Films about classical music and musicians
1980s Telugu-language films
Films about the arts
Indian romantic musical films
1980s romantic musical films
Films directed by K. Viswanath
Films scored by K. V. Mahadevan
Indian musical drama films
1987 drama films